Bergwind is a 1963 Austrian drama film written and directed by Eduard von Borsody. It was entered into the 4th Moscow International Film Festival.

Cast
 Hans von Borsody as Dr. Alexander Rell
 Alwy Becker as Patricia Theotokis
 Reinhard Kolldehoff as Mr. Wright
 Wolf Albach-Retty as Herr Meister

References

External links
 

1963 films
1963 drama films
1960s German-language films
Austrian black-and-white films
Films set in the Alps
Mountaineering films
Austrian drama films